Bhawanathpur Assembly constituency is one of the 81 Vidhan Sabha (Legislative Assembly) constituencies of Jharkhand state in eastern India.

Overview
Bhawanathpur (constituency number 81) is one of the two Jharkhand Vidhan Sabha constituencies in Garhwa district. It is one of the Assembly segments of the Palamu Lok Sabha constituency along with 5 other segments, namely, Garhwa in this district and Daltonganj, Bishrampur, Chhatarpur and Hussainabad in Palamu district.

Members of Legislative Assembly

References

 

Assembly constituencies of Jharkhand
Garhwa district